Schiandra Yael González Jurado (born 4 July 1995) is a Panamanian footballer who plays as a midfielder for CD Plaza Amador and the Panama women's national team. She is nicknamed Sandrita.

Early life
González was born in David.

Club career
González has played for Estrellas Chiricanas in Panama and for SUVA Sports in Costa Rica.

International career
González represented Panama at the 2012 CONCACAF Women's U-17 Championship. She made her senior debut on 24 March 2018 in a 1–1 friendly away draw against Trinidad and Tobago.

References

1995 births
Living people
People from David District
Panamanian women's footballers
Women's association football midfielders
Panama women's international footballers
Panamanian expatriate women's footballers
Panamanian expatriate sportspeople in Costa Rica
Expatriate women's footballers in Costa Rica